Yaacov Kaufman (born 1945) is a Soviet-born Israeli industrial designer and academic. Kaufman's work has focused on lighting, furniture, and product design. He is a longtime professor at the Bezalel Academy of Arts and Design.

Early life
Yaacov Kaufman was born in the Soviet Union (Russia) and lived in Poland until immigrating to Israel in 1957.

Career
Kaufman has been a professor at the Bezalel Academy of Arts and Design for over 3 decades, training "several generations" of Israeli designers. The Jerusalem Report calls Kaufman, "the elder statesman of Israeli design."

Selected exhibitions
Kaufman has had more than 20 international solo exhibitions.

2016  The Heart of the Matter, Eretz Israel Museum. 
 2015 Design Museum Holon
 2011 Tel Aviv Museum of Art

Awards and honors
Kaufman won the Sandberg Prize in 1989. He received the 2003 Norwegian Design Council Award for Industrial Design Excellence.

Collections
Kaufman's work is included in the collections of the Design Museum Holon, the Tel Aviv Museum of Art and the Israel Museum, Jerusalem.

See also
Visual arts in Israel

References

External links
 

Israeli industrial designers
Product designers
Living people
1945 births
Academic staff of Bezalel Academy of Arts and Design
Israeli people of Russian-Jewish descent
Soviet emigrants to Israel
20th-century Israeli male artists
21st-century Israeli male artists
Jewish Israeli artists
Sandberg Prize recipients